In the C programming language, register is a reserved word (or keyword), type modifier, storage class, and hint. The register keyword was deprecated in C++, until it became reserved and unused in C++17. It suggests that the compiler stores a declared variable in a CPU register (or some other faster location) instead of in random-access memory. If possible depending on the type of CPU and complexity of the program code, it will optimize access to that variable and hence improve the execution time of a program. In C (but not C++ where the keyword is essentially ignored) the location of a variable declared with register cannot be accessed, but the sizeof operator can be applied. Aside from this limitation, register is essentially meaningless in modern compilers due to optimization which will place variables in a register if appropriate regardless of whether the hint is given. For programming of embedded systems register may still be significant; for example the Microchip MPLAB XC32 compiler allows the programmer to specify a particular register with the keyword; however, this is discouraged in favor of the compiler's optimizations. When used, register is typically for loop counters, or possibly for other very frequently used variables in the code.

Examples
/* store integer variable "i" in RAM, register, or other location as compiler sees fit */
int i;   

/* suggests storing integer variable "i" in a CPU register or other fast location */
register int i;

See also
Optimizing compiler
Program optimization
Static (keyword)

References

C (programming language)
Variable (computer science)